Blackford High School may refer to:

Blackford High School (Hartford City, Indiana)
Blackford High School, San Jose, California, renamed to Boynton High School in 2002